Charles-Albert Demoustier (13 March 1760 – 2 March 1801) was a French writer. He falsely claimed to be a descendant of La Fontaine by his mother and Racine by his father.

Demoustier was born in Villers-Cotterêts.  He worked as a lawyer, but later decided to become a writer. In 1786, he published  the first part of Lettres à Emilie sur la mythologie. The sixth part was published in 1798.

These works, alternating prose and madrigal-like verses, were very successful.

Demoustier tried to edit Lettres à Emilie sur la mythologie, but the bookseller who owned the copyrights refused to let him do so, perhaps because he had a stock of earlier copies he wanted to get rid of first. Demoustier was unable to wait, as he died a painful, premature death, in Paris, soon after.

He also wrote comedies, among them:

 Conciliateur ou l'Homme aimable, in 5 acts and in verse, 1791
 Femmes, in 3 acts and in verse
 Alceste ou le misanthrope corrigé, in 3 acts and in verse

Demoustier also wrote libretti to some operas (e.g. Épicure, 1800), a Cours de morale, Opuscules and short Poèmes, 1804.

References
Dictionnaire universel d'histoire et de géographie (Bouillet et Chassang), public domain.

External links
 

1761 births
1801 deaths
18th-century French writers
18th-century French male writers
18th-century French dramatists and playwrights
French didactic writers
French opera librettists